The Kingston, Ontario Inner Harbour is situated at the south end of the Cataraqui River northeast of the downtown core  of Kingston, Ontario, Canada. It is the section of Kingston Harbour that is north of the La Salle Causeway.  

Geography of Kingston, Ontario
Transport in Kingston, Ontario